Vortex cannon may refer to:
Vortex cannon, a mythical anti-aircraft weapon
Air vortex cannon, a toy producing doughnut-shaped air vortices

See also
Vortex gun (disambiguation)